Alla Ilinichna Surikova (born November 6, 1940, in Kyiv) is a Soviet and Russian film director, writer, and teacher.

She is a People's Artist of Russia (2000), winner of the Award of the Government of the Russian Federation (2009), and a member of the Russian Union of Cinematographers.

She is best known as the director of the Red Western comedy film A Man from the Boulevard des Capucines which starred famous Soviet actors including Andrei Mironov, Aleksandra Yakovleva, Nikolai Karachentsov, Oleg Tabakov, Leonid Yarmolnik, Mikhail Boyarsky and Igor Kvasha.

Selected filmography
 Fuss of the Fusses (Суета сует, 1979)
 Be my husband (Будьте моим мужем, 1982)
 Look for a Woman (Ищите женщину, 1983)
 Sincerely Yours... (Искренне Ваш..., 1985)
 A Man from the Boulevard des Capucines (1987)
 Two arrows. Stone Age Detective (Две стрелы. Детектив каменного века, 1989)
 Crazies (Чокнутые, 1991)
 Moscow Vacation (Московские каникулы, 1995)
 Children of Monday (Дети понедельника, 1997)
 I Want to Go to Prison (Хочу в тюрьму, 1998)

References

External links
 

1940 births
Living people
Film people from Kyiv
Soviet women film directors
Russian women film directors
Soviet screenwriters
20th-century Russian screenwriters
People's Artists of Russia
Taras Shevchenko National University of Kyiv alumni
High Courses for Scriptwriters and Film Directors alumni